XHPM-FM is a radio station on 100.1 FM located in the city of San Luis Potosí City, San Luis Potosí, Mexico. It is owned by GlobalMedia and affiliated with W Radio.

History
XHPM received its concession on August 25, 1978. It was owned by MVS Radio founder Joaquín Vargas Gómez and carried MVS's Stereorey format for 25 years. In 1990, XHPM was sold to Centro de Frecuencia Modulada. In 2002, the Stereorey format was replaced nationwide with Best FM, offering a newer music mix. XHPM was the last Best FM station until, like most others, it was converted to the La Mejor grupera format on March 12, 2007.

2009 saw an alliance between Controladora de Medios, a local company, and MVS to produce GlobalMedia. GlobalMedia restored the Stereorey name and format in November 2009—the only city where this had happened. In January 2012, XHPM kept the format but changed its name to FM Globo, which did not originally have this format, and then in June, XHPM took on the unique "Hundred FM" name.

On January 16, 2017, XHPM changed its name to "WFM" and picked up W Radio talk programs. The station fully branded as W Radio in May 2020.

References

Radio stations in San Luis Potosí
Mass media in San Luis Potosí City